Coolen is a Dutch patronymic surname. Variant forms are Colen, Kolen and Koolen. Cool and Kool are archaic short forms of the given name Nicolaas. In Canada the name may also have evolved as a modern spelling of Coulon. 

Notable people with this surname include:

 Antoon Coolen (1897-1961), Dutch writer
 Coenrad Laurens Coolen (1773-?), Indonesian evangelist
  (1944–2016), Belgian jazz trumpet player
 Louis Coolen (born 1952), Dutch football midfielder and manager
 Nadia Coolen (born 1994), Dutch football forward
 Nancy Coolen (born 1973), Dutch singer and television host
 Rini Coolen (born 1967), Dutch football defender and manager
 Tom Coolen (born 1953), Canadian ice hockey coach
  (born 1995), Belgian cyclist
Koolen
 Dionysius A.P.N. Koolen (1871–1945), Dutch politician, Minister of Labour, Trade and Industry 1925-26
 Kees Koolen (born 1965), Dutch rally raid racer and businessman
 Nicole Koolen (born 1972), Dutch field hockey player
 Roel Koolen (born 1982), Dutch baseball player

See also
 Ricky Koole (born 1972), Dutch singer and film actress
 Colen, surname and given name
 Coole (disambiguation)

References

Dutch-language surnames
Patronymic surnames